The 2004 ITF Jounieh Open was a tennis tournament played on Clay courts. It was the 1st edition of the ITF Jounieh Open, and was part of the $50,000 tournaments of the 2004 ITF Women's Circuit. It took place in Jounieh, Lebanon, from September 21–26, 2004. The total prize money offered at this tournament was US$50,000.

WTA entrants

Seeds

 Rankings as of September 14, 2004.

Other entrants
The following players received wildcards into the singles main draw:
  Heidi El Tabakh
  Mandy Minella
  Petra Cetkovská 
  Mariana Muci

The following players received entry from the qualifying draw:
  Franziska Etzel
  Maria Abramović
  Laura Siegemund
  Eva-Maria Hoch

Champions

Singles

 Nuria Llagostera Vives def.  Lourdes Domínguez Lino, 2–6, 6–0, 6–4.

Doubles

 Petra Cetkovská /  Hana Šromová def.  Nuria Llagostera Vives /  Frederica Piedade, 6–4, 6–2.

References
http://www.tennisexplorer.com/jounieh-itf/2004/wta-women/

2004 ITF Women's Circuit
ITF Jounieh Open